Eduardo "Edu" Gauto Gallegos (born 21 December 1987) is an Argentine Paralympic judoka who competes in international judo competitions. He is a Parapan American Games champion and a Pan American silver medalist. He has competed at the Paralympic Games twice.

References

1987 births
Living people
Sportspeople from Lanús
Paralympic judoka of Argentina
Judoka at the 2016 Summer Paralympics
Judoka at the 2020 Summer Paralympics
Medalists at the 2015 Parapan American Games
Medalists at the 2019 Parapan American Games
20th-century Argentine people
21st-century Argentine people